Michael C. Mackey  is an American biomathematician and Professor in the Department of Physiology who holds the Joseph Morley Drake Emeritus Chair in Physiology at McGill University in Montreal, Quebec, Canada.

Biography 
He received a Bachelor of Arts (BA, 1963) in Mathematics from the University of Kansas and completed a Doctor of Philosophy (Ph.D., 1968) in Physiology and Biophysics at the University of Washington.

He became a professor in the Department of Physiology at McGill University, as well as Director of the Centre for Applied Mathematics in Bioscience and Medicine and the Mathematical Physiology Laboratory.

In 1999, he was elected a fellow of the Royal Society of Canada in the Academy of Science.  He is a Fellow of the American Physical Society (2006), Society for Industrial and Applied Mathematics (SIAM, 2009) and the Society for Mathematical Biology (2017). He was awarded a Forschungspreis by the Alexander von Humboldt Foundation at Bremen University in 1987, and a Doctorat honoris causa by the Universite de Lyon in 2010 and the University of Silesia in 2019, and was the Leverhulme Professor of Mathematical Biology at University of Oxford in 2001-2002.

Research 
His research focuses on the development of mathematical models, such as the Mackey-Glass equations, to describe physiological processes at the cellular and molecular levels as well as foundational questions in physics related to the nature of irreversibility and the arrow of time.

Publications

Books 
 M.C. Mackey. Ion Transport Through Biological Membranes: An Integrated Theoretical Approach, Springer-Verlag, Berlin, Heidelberg, New York, 1975. 
 A. Lasota & M.C. Mackey. Probabilistic Properties of Deterministic Systems, Cambridge University Press, New York-Cambridge, 1985. 
 L. Rensing, U. an der Heiden & M.C. Mackey (eds). Temporal Disorder in Human Oscillatory Systems, Springer-Verlag, New York, Berlin, Heidelberg, 1987. 
 L. Glass & M.C. Mackey. From Clocks to Chaos: The Rhythms of Life. Princeton University Press, 1988. Russian (1991), Chinese (1995) and Portuguese (1997) translations appeared.
 M.C. Mackey. Time's Arrow: The Origins of Thermodynamic Behaviour. Springer-Verlag, 1992. Reprinted by Dover Publications, 2003.
 A. Lasota & M.C. Mackey. Chaos, Fractals and Noise: Stochastic Aspects of Dynamics. Springer-Verlag, 1994.
 A. Beuter, L. Glass, M. C. Mackey & M. Titcombe (eds). Nonlinear Dynamics in Physiology and Medicine. Springer Verlag, 2003.
 M.C. Mackey, M. Santillan, M. Tyran-Kaminska & E.S. Zeron. Simple Mathematical Models of Gene Regulatory Dynamics. Springer-Verlag, 2016.
 J. Losson, M.C. Mackey, R. Taylor & M. Tyran-Kaminska. Density evolution under delayed dynamics: An open problem. Fields Institutes Monographs, Springer-Verlag, (2020).

Selected articles 
 M.C. Mackey & L. Glass. "Oscillation and chaos in physiological control systems", Science (1977) 197, pp. 287– 289.
 M.C. Mackey "A unified hypothesis for the origin of aplastic anemia and periodic haematopoiesis", Blood (1978) 51, pp. 941–956.
 L. Glass & M.C. Mackey "Pathological conditions resulting from instabilities in physiological control systems", Ann. N.Y. Acad. Sci. (1979) 316, pp. 214–235.
 U. an der Heiden & M.C. Mackey "The dynamics of production and destruction: Analytic insight into complex behaviour", J. Math. Biol. (1982) 16, pp. 75–101.
 M.C. Mackey & J.G. Milton. "Dynamical diseases", Ann. N.Y. Acad. Sci. (1987), 504, pp. 16–32.
 U. an der Heiden & M.C. Mackey  "Mixed feedback: A paradigm for regular and irregular oscillations", in Temporal Disorder in Human Oscillatory Systems (eds. L. Rensing, U. an der Heiden, and M.C. Mackey), Springer- Verlag, New York, Berlin, Heidelberg 1987, pp 30–36.
 M.C. Mackey "Commodity price fluctuations: Price dependent delays and nonlinearities as explanatory factors", J. Econ. Theory (1989), 48, pp. 497–509.
 M.C. Mackey "The dynamic origin of increasing entropy", Rev. Mod. Phys. (1989) 61, pp. 981–1016.
 J.M. Mahaffy, J. Belair, & M.C. Mackey "Hematopoietic model with moving boundary condition and state dependent delay", J. Theor. Biol. (1998), 190, pp. 135–146.
 C. Haurie, D.C. Dale, & M.C. Mackey "Cyclical neutropenia and other periodic hematological disorders: A review of mechanisms and mathematical models", Blood (1998), 92, pp. 2629–2640.
 N. Yildirim & M.C. Mackey  "Feedback regulation in the lactose operon: A mathematical modeling study and comparison with experimental data", Biophy. J. (2003), 84, pp. 2841–2851.
 C. Colijn & M.C. Mackey "A mathematical model of hematopoiesis: I & II", J. Theor. Biol. (2005) 237, pp. 117–146.
 M.C. Mackey & M. Tyran-Kaminska  "Deterministic Brownian Motion: The effects of perturbing a dynamical system by a chaotic semi-dynamical system", Phys. Reports (2006) 422, pp. 167–222.
 C. Beck & M.C. Mackey  "Measurability of vacuum fluctuations and dark energy", Physica A. (2007), 379, pp. 101–110.
 M.J. Piotrowska, H. Enderling, U. an der Heiden & M.C. Mackey  "Mathematical modeling of stem cells related to cancer", in Cancer and stem cells (eds. T. Dittmar & K. S. Zänker), Nova Science Publisher, Hauppauge, NY (2008).
 M. Craig, A.R. Humphries & M.C. Mackey  "A mathematical model of granulopoiesis incorporating the negative feedback dynamics and kinetics of G-CSF/neutrophil binding and internalisation", Bull. Math. Biol. (2016), 78, pp. 2304–2357.
 M.C. Mackey & M. Tyran-Kaminska.  "How can we describe density evolution under delayed dynamics?", Chaos (2021), 31, https://doi.org/10.1063/5.0038310

References

Internal link 
 Joseph Morley Drake

Living people
University of Washington alumni
Academic staff of McGill University
Fellows of the Royal Society of Canada
1942 births